Deherainia smaragdina is a species of shrub in the family Primulaceae, found in Honduras, Guatemala, Belize, and Mexico, and notable for its green flowers and unpleasant smell.

Gallery of the green flowers

References

External links

Primulaceae
Endemic flora of Mexico
Plants described in 1859